Rowing was contested in seven men's events at the 1971 Pan American Games in Cali, Colombia.

Medal summary

Medal table

Men's events

1971
1971 Pan American Games
Pan American Games
Rowing in Colombia